Chiang Chih-hsien (born 21 February 1988) is a Taiwanese professional baseball player for the Fubon Guardians of the Chinese Professional Baseball League (CPBL).

Career

Boston Red Sox
Chiang signed as an infielder for the Boston Red Sox organization in 2005. He was converted to the outfield after the 2008 season. He played for the Double A Portland Sea Dogs since 2010 and has a breakthrough year in 2011. Chiang was honored as Eastern League Player of the Month for June, and was selected to participate in both the Major League Baseball Futures Game and the Eastern League All-Star Game.

Seattle Mariners
On 31 July 2011, Chiang was traded to the Seattle Mariners in a package deal for Érik Bédard. Chiang concluded his stats as a Sea Dog, hitting .340/.402/.648 with 18 homers, 37 doubles, 76 RBI, 25 walks, 61 strikeouts in 321 at-bats. He led the league in AVG, SLG, RBI, OPS, extra base hits at the time of trade. He collected back-to-back Eastern League player of the month for his monstrous July: .430/.500/.740, 16 doubles, 5 homers, 25 RBI. Chiang played 40 games for the Tacoma Rainiers before being demoted to Double A Jackson Generals. On 12 June, 2012, Chiang was removed from the 40-man roster to make room for Oliver Perez and designated for assignment.

Texas Rangers
After the 2012 season, Chiang became a free agent  and signed a minor league contract with the Texas Rangers organization. He became a free agent after the 2013 season.

Baltimore Orioles

The Baltimore Orioles signed Chiang to a minor league contract on 18 November 2013 and he spent time with the Bowie Baysox and Frederick Keys before becoming a free agent after the 2014 season.

Chinatrust Brothers
On 24 July 2015, Chinatrust Brothers signed a NT $12.42 million contract for multi-three years contract to Chiang.
On 6 November 2017, Chiang was released by Chinatrust Brothers.

Fubon Guardians
On 15 January 2018, Chiang signed a one-year contract with the Fubon Guardians. Chiang was in the Opening Day lineup for the Guardians in 2021.

International career
Chiang also played for the Chinese Taipei baseball team in the 2009 World Baseball Classic, 2013 exhibition games against Japan and 2017 World Baseball Classic.

References

External links

1988 births
Living people
Asian Games medalists in baseball
Asian Games silver medalists for Chinese Taipei
Baseball outfielders
Baseball players at the 2014 Asian Games
Baseball players at the 2008 Summer Olympics
Bowie Baysox players
Frederick Keys players
Frisco RoughRiders players
Greenville Drive players
Gulf Coast Red Sox players
Jackson Generals (Southern League) players
Lancaster JetHawks players
Lowell Spinners players
People from Taitung County
Portland Sea Dogs players
Medalists at the 2014 Asian Games
Salem Red Sox players
Tacoma Rainiers players
Taiwanese expatriate baseball players in Japan
Taiwanese expatriate baseball players in the United States
2009 World Baseball Classic players
2015 WBSC Premier12 players
2017 World Baseball Classic players
Olympic baseball players of Taiwan
Sydney Blue Sox players
Taiwanese expatriate baseball players in Australia